Lists of abbreviations contain abbreviations and acronyms in different languages and fields. They include Latin and English abbreviations and acronyms.

Classical abbreviations

List of classical abbreviations (Latin abbreviations that occur in the writings and inscriptions of the Romans)
List of Latin abbreviations (Common Latin abbreviations that have been adopted by Modern English)
List of medieval abbreviations (Abbreviations used by ancient and medieval scribes writing in various languages, including Latin, Greek, Old English and Old Norse)

English language abbreviations

Lists of abbreviations in the English language:
 Athletics abbreviations
 List of business and finance abbreviations
 List of computing and IT abbreviations
 List of ecclesiastical abbreviations
 List of energy abbreviations
 List of abbreviations in photography
 List of glossing abbreviations (grammatical terms used in linguistic interlinear glossing)
 List of legal abbreviations
 List of medical abbreviations
 List of abbreviations for medical organisations and personnel
 Reporting mark (owners of rolling stock and other railway equipment)
 List of style guide abbreviations
 List of abbreviations used on Wikipedia for Wikipedia things

Acronyms

An acronym is a type of abbreviation formed from the initial components of the words of a longer name or phrase,

 Lists of acronyms
 Three-letter acronyms
 List of government and military acronyms
 List of U.S. government and military acronyms
 List of U.S. Navy acronyms

Other languages

Abbreviations in other languages:

 List of German abbreviations
 List of Hebrew abbreviations

See also

:Category:Lists of abbreviations
:Category:Glossaries of sports